I'm Rose, Darling is a 2015 Burmese drama film directed by Wyne and starring Nay Toe and Phway Phway. It is one of the films that reached the highest-grossing film in Myanmar. This film was achieved Best Actress and Best Director Awards at Myanmar Motion Picture Academy Awards.

Plot 
Khune Tha (Nay Toe) lives with his grandfather at Htar Thakhin 's (Phway Phway) House in Pyinoolwin as a housekeeper after his father died.

Htar Thakhin visited her house in Pyinoolwin and met with Khune Tha for the first time in her young age. She bullies on Khune Tha in all kind of ways from childhood to adulthood. Khune Tha is patient with her due to his grandfather's advice. A few years later the fortune of Htar Thakhin has turned. Her father was dead and she lost all of her properties because of her grandmother. Since she is a naughty person she cannot communicate with others. By chance her roommate at a hostel introduced her to a job at shoes sale counter.

Khune Tha comes to Yangon, works hard and become a millionaire by chance. One day, Khune Tha accidentally meets Htar Thakhin at shopping mall where she works and Khune Tha has a plan to revenge on her, but instead it becomes a love story.

Main cast 
 Nay Toe as Khune Tha
 Phway Phway as Htar Thakhin
  Heavy Phyo as Young Khune Tha, childhood life of Khune Tha
 Yoon Yoon as Young Htar Thakhin, childhood life of Htar Takhin

Awards 
Myanmar Times reported the film as a "box office hit".

 2015, Myanmar Motion Picture Academy Awards 'Best Female Lead Actress' award for – Phway Phway
 2015, Myanmar Motion Picture Academy Awards 'Best Director' award for  Wyne (film director)

Production 
Thet Mon Myint was the first planned actress in this movie. She refused to act in the kiss scene (an addition to the plot by the director) due to cultural reservations.  Phway Phway was replaced in Thet Mon Myint. Although there were a lot of media attacks against Phway Phway she managed to make the film.

This film had problems before recording and also during showing time.

References 

Burmese drama films
2010s Burmese-language films
2015 films
Films directed by Wyne